Air Vice-Marshal John Frederick Roberts,  (24 February 1913 – 20 April 1996) was a Welsh cricketer and Royal Air Force officer.

Fred Roberts was born in Pontardawe and educated at Pontardawe Grammar School. Playing for Glamorgan from 1934 to 1936 and for Combined Services from 1946 to 1949, he appeared in eight first-class matches as a left-handed batsman. He scored 204 runs with a highest score of 52.

He joined the Royal Air Force in 1938, served in the Middle East during World War II and was mentioned in despatches. After the war he rose to the rank of air vice-marshal and was appointed a CBE and CB. He was the RAF's Director General of Ground Training.

References

External links

1913 births
1996 deaths
People from Pontardawe
Welsh cricketers
Glamorgan cricketers
Combined Services cricketers
Royal Air Force personnel of World War II
Commanders of the Order of the British Empire
Companions of the Order of the Bath
Royal Air Force air marshals